Susanna and the Elders is a painting by the Venetian painter Tintoretto (Jacopo Robusti, 15181594). Robusti, also known as Tintoretto or IlFurioso, for the energy and "fury" with which he painted, depicted both sacred and profane subjects in a period sometimes known as the Venetian “golden century”.

Susanna and the Elders (c.1555–56) depicts a scene from the biblical episode of Susanna, from the Book of Daniel.

The painting shows Susanna, a young married woman, sitting on the edge of a small pool, preparing to take a bath. She is watched by two elderly men, acquaintances of her husband, who desire her. The lustful elders are depicted in the painting hiding behind a rose trellis in her garden. They are watching and spying on her, trying to find an opportunity to catch her alone in the garden.

The story of Susanna and the elders was frequently depicted in art history. The painting is full of symbols. The objects beside the main figure included white pearls, silver jewelry, a silk shawl, and a silver jug. The painting is considered one of Tintoretto's "masterpieces".

Subject
According to the story, a young married Jewish woman named Susanna bathed in a pool in her garden every day. One day, two elderly men who were guests of Susanna's wealthy husband Joakim, lusted for Susanna, who was described as "The Beautiful Susanna". The elderswho were judges and respectable members of the communitycame to an agreement that they would wait until Susanna was alone in the garden and then have their way with her. After Susanna sent away her maids to fetch fragrant oils and perfumes for her bath, the two men rushed forward, propositioning her to have sex with them. They threatened to denounce her if she rejected their advances.

Susanna rejected their proposal. The two prominent elders of the community then publicly denounced her, falsely accusing her of committing adultery with a young man. According to ancient Jewish law, adultery was punishable by death, and Susanna was condemned to death after everyone believed the two judges' story. Upset and crying, Susanna was taken away to be executed. She turned to God, calling upon him to prove her innocence. A young man named Daniel was standing in the crowd watching. While witnessing the procession Daniel heard the voice of an angel. The angel urged him to speak up and prevent the killing of an innocent woman who was being framed for doing something she had not done. (The young Daniel would later be known as the prophet Daniel.) The young man, surprised, felt obliged to halt the execution. He asked to be allowed to interrogate the two elders separately so that they could not speak to each other. Daniel then cross-examined the judges on how they had discovered Susanna, what the young man looked like, where they secretly met and so on. He kept receiving contradictory answers from the elders. When asked under which tree Susanna had committed adultery, the two elders gave very different answers and named different kinds of trees. The elderly judges were exposed for lying and for bearing false witnessa capital crime according to ancient Jewish law. Daniel proved Susanna was innocent, and she was freed while the elders were condemned.

Painting

The painting is a sumptuous work showing a naked Susanna sitting in a garden beside a pool, leaning against a tree, and facing a dense rose trellis, against which leans a mirror. Susanna gazes into the mirror. Around her on the ground are several bright objects including a white silk shawl, pearls, jewelry, a comb, and silverware, which together form a kind of still life. Susanna's body is contrasted in a masterful way against the dark mass of the rose trellis, and the dark water, while the bodies of the three figures form a triangle. Sunlight falls on parts of Susanna's face and body, which Tintoretto has worked out as a chiaroscuro effect. The lines of the slightly forced perspective of the rose trellis draw the viewer into the scene, opening up new vistas through the arch in the background and adding depth to the painting. Two elderly men peer around either end of the rose trellis to watch her. Tintoretto's fascination with materials and colours can be seen in the treatment of the dim silvery light that illuminates Susanna's sumptuous body with crystalline clarity. The light reflects on her complexion and on the small and skillfully painted still life at her feet, contrasting with the rich shadows. Susanna is depicted in a sensual manner with  elaborately braided hair. She is sitting absorbed by her reflection in the mirror and unaware of the intruders. The viewer is, of course, well aware of the two men, who seem just about move toward her, releasing the tension of the scene and adding a certain drama to the painting.

The rose trellis is set between two trees. The trunk of the front tree extends like a line over the entire height of the image and divides it into two sections: a left one, which only covers about 20 percent of the image area, and a much larger right one, which takes up about 80 percent.

A magpie is sitting on a branch to the right above Susanna, behind it one can see a bush of elder. A family of ducks is swimming in the river on the right behind an old man. The narrow garden area with the swimming pool is delimited by a wooden fence in addition to the rose hedge. The poles in the entrance area are designed as caryatides. Through the entrance, the view opens into a spacious garden landscape with a river, meadows and forest. On the river bank in the background you can see a deer and a hind. A closer look reveals the outline of a city surrounded by water, which is most likely the lagoon city of Venice - Tintoretto's home.

Interpretation 

For his depiction of the subject of the biblical story, Tintoretto chooses a scene in which Susanna seems so absorbed in her reflection that she does not notice the two ambushed, voyeuristic and defamatory old people. In addition, the artist places the act of Susanna so clearly in the spotlight using the technique of chiaroscuro that the viewer himself becomes a voyeur.

In order to clarify the moral message contained in the biblical narrative, Tintoretto uses animal and color symbolism. The magpie stands for the impending defamation, the ducks for loyalty, the roses for lust. The white of the elder flowers and the objects next to Susanna stand for innocence and purity. The red robe of the elders signals danger and lust. The deer stands for desire and lust, to be interpreted.

The front tree trunk divides the painting into two parts, which could be interpreted as two scenes. The outline-like representation of Venice in the smaller left part of the picture suggests that the bathing Susanna in the larger right part symbolizes the lagoon city of Venice. In addition, the deer as a sign of desire can be seen in connection with the political events at the time of the creation of Tintoretto's painting: Around the middle of the 16th century, Venice was under threat by the Ottoman Empire under Suleiman the Magnificent, because since the Battle of Preveza the Ottoman fleet has become the leading naval power in the Mediterranean Sea. Suleiman's rule even extends to the area of the former Babylon, where the story depicted by Tintoretto has taken place. Accordingly, the two old men in the painting are emblematic of the Ottomans who desire the beautiful, rich city of Venice.

With Susanna as a personified representation of Venice and the deer as a symbol of lust, the picture could also be interpreted as a hidden criticism of Venetian society at Tintoretto's time. The numerous prostitutes of the city were made the scapegoats of venereal diseases such as syphilis, which affected Venice in the form of fatal epidemic.  Susanna is considered innocent both in the biblical narrative and in the image of Tintoretto. In a figurative sense, this could mean that Tintoretto does not denounce the prostitutes of Venice, but the men who - despite the threat of infection persistently indulging in their lust - use their services, but shift the blame for sexually transmitted diseases onto women.

History
Tintoretto's  Susanna and the Elders  from 1555/56 is one of several works on the same subject from the artist's studio. One of the pictures is exhibited at the Louvre, the Museo del Prado and in the NGA Washington.

See also
 Susanna (Book of Daniel)
 Susanna and the Elders in art

Further reading
 Hahn, R.. (2004). Caught in the Act: Looking at Tintoretto's Susanna. The Massachusetts Review, 45(4), 633–647.  Retrieved from JStor

References

External links
 Susanna and the elders. Video of the Kunsthistorisches Museum in International Sign with English subtitles.
 Jacopo Robusti, genannt Tintoretto – Susanna im Bade.  German article by Karl Schütz on the website Capella-Academica.

Paintings by Tintoretto
1550s paintings
Tintoretto
Paintings in the collection of the Kunsthistorisches Museum